The Lawrenceville Correctional Center is a privately operated, medium-security state prison for men located in Lawrenceville, Brunswick County, Virginia.  Since 2003 GEO Group has operated the prison under contract with the Virginia Department of Corrections.  It houses 1555 inmates.

When the facility was first completed in 1998 as the first private prison in Virginia, it was managed by Corrections Corporation of America.

References

Prisons in Virginia
Buildings and structures in Brunswick County, Virginia
GEO Group